Keeping Time is the second studio album by American actor, singer and songwriter Paul Jabara.

The album, which was released on Casablanca Records in 1978, includes Jabara's song "Trapped in a Stairway" from the movie Thank God It's Friday, his own version of the Grammy Award-winning "Last Dance" (originally recorded by Donna Summer) as well as the duets "Something's Missing" (with Summer) and "Take Good Care of My Baby / What's a Girl to Do" (with Pattie Brooks). The lead single from the album was "Dancin' (Lift Your Spirits Higher)". Betty Lederer from Billboard, elected "Pleasure Island" as the best cut of the album, the magazine also choose the album as the best disco album of the week, giving it a favorable review. The album peaked at number 12 in the National Disco Action Top 40.

Keeping Time was released on CD by Gold Legion in 2011.

Track listing
Side one
 "Didn't the Time Go Fast" - 4:17
 "Saturday Matinee" - 3:24
 "Trapped in a Stairway" (from the Original Soundtrack Album Thank God It's Friday) - 3:13
 "Take Good Care of My Baby / What's a Girl to Do" (duet with Pattie Brooks) - 4:47
 "Dancin' (Lift Your Spirits Higher)" - 3:39

Side two
 "Last Dance" - 3:10
 "Pleasure Island" - 10:40
 "Something's Missing" (duet with Donna Summer) - 3:02

Personnel
Paul Jabara - vocals
Jay Graydon, Steve Lukather, Ira Newborn, Thom Rotella, Ben Benay - guitar
David Hungate, Chuck Rainey, Bob Glaub - bass
David Foster, Richard Tee, Jai Winding, Bob Esty, William Smith, Bill Payne - keyboards
Rick Shlosser, Mike Baird, Ed Greene - drums
Alan Estes, Victor Feldman, Tommy Vig - percussion
Jerry Jumonville - saxophone on "Trapped on a Stairway"
Bernie Fleischer, Jack Nimitz, Jon Kip - flutes on "Pleasure Island"
Bob Esty, Carlene Williams, Mary Ellen Gaines, Becky Lopez, Dani MiCormick, Patti Brooks, Petsye Powell, Carole Bayer Sager, Michele Aller, Brenda Russell - background vocals

References

Paul Jabara albums
1978 albums
Casablanca Records albums